Acanthobrama persidis is a species of freshwater cyprinid fish, which is endemic to  Iran.

References

persidis
Fish described in 1981